Ornipholidotos amieti is a butterfly in the family Lycaenidae. It is found in Cameroon, the Republic of the Congo, the Central African Republic, the Democratic Republic of the Congo, Uganda, Kenya and Tanzania. The habitat consists of forests.

Subspecies
 Ornipholidotos amieti amieti (Cameroon, Congo, Central African Republic, Democratic Republic of the Congo)
 Ornipholidotos amieti angulata Libert, 2005 (Democratic Republic of the Congo, Uganda, western Kenya, north-western Tanzania)

References

Butterflies described in 2005
Taxa named by Michel Libert
Ornipholidotos